Schistura bella is a species of ray-finned fish in the genus Schistura.

References 

B
Taxa named by Maurice Kottelat
Fish described in 1990